Tangoe, Inc. is an information technology company that builds telecom expense management, managed mobility services, and cloud expense management software.

History
The company was founded in 2000 and had its initial public offering in 2011. The company was then taken private in 2017 by Marlin Equity Partners for $242.6 million in cash.  Tangoe was then combined with another Marlin portfolio company, Asentinel.

SEC Fraud Probe 
On September 4, 2018, the SEC brought charges for improperly recognizing approximately $40 million in revenue by violating provisions of the federal securities laws. A settlement of $1.5 million in penalties for the company, as well as an additional $100,000, $50,000, and $20,000 in penalties was reached between the former CEO, former CFO, and former Vice President of Finance respectively. On September 10, 2020, the SEC obtains final judgment against the remaining defendant and former Senior VP, Donald J. Farias, for an additional $20,000 in penalties and bars him serving as an officer or director of a public company for five years.

Acquisitions
In 2009, Tangoe acquired InterNoded Inc, a mobile device managed services provider.

In 2018, the company acquired mobility management company MOBI Wireless Management.

References

External links

Companies based in Morris County, New Jersey
Orange, Connecticut
Software companies established in 2000
2011 initial public offerings
Parsippany-Troy Hills, New Jersey